Days Go By is the second compilation album by New Zealand-born Australian country music artist Keith Urban, released on 20 May 2005 by Capitol Nashville. The album is named for his 2004 single of the same name, included on his previous full-length album, Be Here (2004). Also included on this album are tracks from that album and Golden Road (2002).

Album cover
The front cover features the same picture used on the American release of Urban's album Be Here.

Track listing

Personnel

Chart performance

Certifications

References

2005 compilation albums
Keith Urban albums
Capitol Records compilation albums
Albums produced by Dann Huff